The Invasion of the Vampires is a 1963 Mexican horror mystery thriller film directed by Miguel Morayta and starring Erna Martha Bauman, Rafael del Río, Tito Junco, Fernando Soto, Bertha Moss and Carlos Agostí.

It is part of a duology of vampire films directed by Morayta, preceded by The Bloody Vampire (1962).

An English-language dub version was released in 1965, produced by K. Gordon Murray for American International Pictures.

Cast
Erna Martha Bauman as Brunhilda Frankenhausen
Rafael del Río as Dr. Ulises Albarrán
Tito Junco as Marquis Gonzalo Guzmán de la Serna
Fernando Soto as Crescencio (as Fernando Soto "Mantequilla")
Bertha Moss as Frau Hildegarda
Carlos Agostí as Count Frankenhausen
Enrique Lucero as Lázaro
David Reynoso as Don Máximo, Mayor
Enrique García Álvarez as Father Victor
José Chávez as Village Man
Victorio Blanco as Village Old Man (uncredited)
Mario Cid as Paulino, Mayor's Son (uncredited)
Armando Gutiérrez as Don Efrén, physician (uncredited)
Leonor Gómez as Village Woman (uncredited)

Reception
Rob Craig in American International Pictures: A Comprehensive Filmography gave a very positive review of the film, saying "It is a genuinely creepy and moving example of modern Gothic horror, and may be the showpiece of K. Gordon Murray horror canon. There is high drama, supernatural revelation, and even some sexual perversity in this strongest of Mexican horror imports."

References

External links

1963 films
1960s Spanish-language films
1963 horror films
1960s horror thriller films
1960s mystery thriller films
Films directed by Miguel Morayta
Gothic horror films
Mexican horror thriller films
Mexican mystery thriller films
Mexican vampire films
1960s Mexican films